Aleiodes coxalis is a species of parasitoid wasp belonging to the family Braconidae. It was first described by Maximilian Spinola in 1808 as Bracon coxalis. It is found in the Palearctic region.

References

Braconidae
Insects described in 1808